The 1909–10 City Cup was the sixteenth edition of the City Cup, a cup competition in Irish football.

The tournament was won by Linfield for the tenth time.

Group standings

References

1909–10 in Irish association football